William Edwin Bennion (6 September 1881 – 18 December 1940) was an Australian rules footballer who played with Geelong in the Victorian Football League (VFL).

Notes

External links 

1881 births
1940 deaths
Australian rules footballers from Victoria (Australia)
Geelong Football Club players
Geelong West Football Club players
Richmond Football Club (VFA) players